St. Patrick Catholic Church is a Catholic church in Silverton, Colorado. Located at 1005 Reese street, the church was built in 1905.

References

Roman Catholic churches in Colorado
Buildings and structures in San Juan County, Colorado
20th-century Presbyterian church buildings in the United States